Jane Wilkinson may refer to:

Jane Herbert Wilkinson, Texas pioneer
Jane Wilkinson (Protestant), lady-in-waiting to Anne Boleyn and religious exile under Mary I
Jane Wilkinson, a character in the film Thirteen at Dinner
Jane Wilkinson, a character in Lord Edgware Dies